Osteocephalus cabrerai is a species of frog in the family Hylidae. It is found in the Amazon Basin in Brazil (Manaus), northeastern Peru, Ecuador (Sucumbíos and Orellana Provinces), Colombia (Amazonas, Caquetá, and Vaupés Departments), Guyana, and French Guiana, possibly wider. Some earlier records refer to Osteocephalus buckleyi.

Etymology
The specific name cabrerai honours Mr. Isodore Cabrera, a Colombian naturalist and collector.

Description
Adult males can reach  and adult females  in snout–vent length. The snout is truncate. The tympanum is very distinct and elliptical; the supra-tympanic fold is tuberculate. Skin on the dorsum is granulate in females and tuberculate in males; these do not have keratinized tips in breeding males as in Osteocephalus buckleyi. The fingers are one-half webbed. The toes are webbed, reaching base of the disc on the fourth toe. Te dorsal coloration is variable, in shades of green with tan and brown blotches, streaks, or a reticulate pattern. The flanks are light and may have tan blotches. The venter creamy is white, possibly with tan spots. A pale supralabial mark runs posteroventrally from eye to mid-tympanum. Males have paired vocal sacs.

Habitat and conservation
Osteocephalus cabrerai is a lowland tropical rainforest species. Specimens have been spotted on low vegetation in primary forest or the forest edge at night. It is an uncommon species that is locally threatened by habitat loss. Its range includes a number of protected areas.

References

cabrerai
Amphibians of Brazil
Amphibians of Colombia
Amphibians of Ecuador
Amphibians of French Guiana
Amphibians of Guyana
Amphibians of Peru
Amphibians described in 1970
Taxa named by Doris Mable Cochran
Taxonomy articles created by Polbot